Armas Eliel Lindgren (28 November 1874 – 3 October 1929) was Finnish architect, professor and painter.

Biography

Early life and career
Armas Lindgren was born in Hämeenlinna on 28 November 1874. He studied architecture in the Polytechnical Institute of Helsinki, from where he graduated in 1897. While a student he collaborated with Josef Stenbäck and Gustaf Nyström, two well-known Finnish architects.  He spent the 1898–1999 studying history of art and culture in Sweden, Denmark, Germany, France and the United Kingdom. In 1896 he founded with Herman Gesellius and Eliel Saarinen, an architectural firm named Gesellius, Lindgren, Saarinen. The firm was responsible for the realization of several important projects such as the National Museum of Finland in Helsinki.

Teaching

In 1900 he started working at the Polytechnic Institute as a teacher of art history. From 1902 to 1912 he was the Arts Director of the Central School of Applied Arts. In 1905 Lindgren departed from Gesellius, Lindgren, Saarinen. He set up his own office in 1908.  joined his office in 1916.

In the 1910s he collaborated closely with Wivi Lönn. They designed together the Uusi ylioppilastalo in 1910, also the convent of korp! Sakala 1911 and the Estonia Theatre in 1912.

Professor

In 1919 he replaced Gustaf Nyström to the position of the Professor of Architecture at the Helsinki University of Technology. As a professor he taught and influenced the notable Finnish architect Alvar Aalto.

Notable buildings

Notes

References

External links 
 

1874 births
1929 deaths
People from Hämeenlinna
People from Häme Province (Grand Duchy of Finland)
Finnish architects
Academic staff of the University of Helsinki
Academic staff of the Aalto University School of Arts, Design and Architecture